John Stewart, Earl of Mar (December 147911 March 1503) was the youngest son of James III of Scotland and Margaret of Denmark.

Biography
He was born at Dunfermline Palace in Fife as the youngest son of the King. He was created Earl of Mar on 2 March 1486, at the age of eight. Not much is known of his life and he died in Scotland on 11 March 1503. As he died unmarried, the earldom became extinct and James IV awarded many of the Mar lands to Lord Elphinstone.

Family
Stewart had two brothers, King James IV and James Stewart, Duke of Ross. He died unmarried.

Ancestry

References

John
Earls or mormaers of Mar
Scottish princes
1479 births
1503 deaths
15th-century Scottish peers
16th-century Scottish peers
Peers created by James III
Sons of kings